The Chơ Ro (or Chau Ro, Do Ro; Vietnamese: người Chơ Ro) are a Mon–Khmer people in Vietnam. Most Chơ Ro live in the Đồng Nai, Bình Dương, Bình Phước and Bà Rịa–Vũng Tàu provinces. The population was 29,520 in 2019.

Their New Year Festival (Cho Ro language: Yang Pa) has the purpose of worshipping their Rice God.

References 

Ethnic groups in Vietnam